Kladdkaka is a popular Swedish chocolate cake. It is a rich chocolate dessert cake with a crisp exterior and a soft and gooey interior. This dense, compact chocolate cake is similar to  a chocolate brownie and a molten chocolate cake.
The ingredients are flour, eggs, butter, sugar, vanilla essence and cocoa powder. The main difference between kladdkaka and other cakes is the lack of baking powder. It is sometimes eaten with whipped cream or vanilla ice cream and raspberry coulis and/or raspberries.

The origin of the cake is uncertain. One theory is that it originated during World War II, when baking powder was difficult to get hold of in Sweden.

The name derives from the Swedish word "kladdig", meaning "sticky" or "messy".

Since 2008, the kladdkaka has its designated date which is 7 November.

See also
 Molten chocolate cake
List of cakes
 Coffee bread in Swedish cuisine

References

Swedish cuisine
Cakes
Chocolate desserts